Varsity Brands, Inc. is an American apparel company owned by Bain Capital. It is primarily focused on academic apparel and memorabilia, with its operations split among three major subsidiaries, including Herff Jones—a manufacturer of products such as class rings, graduation caps and gowns, and yearbooks; Varsity Spirit—which produces apparel and competitions in cheerleading; and BSN Sports, a distributor of sports uniforms and equipment.

History 
In 2011, Herff Jones merged with Varsity Brands. Its founder and CEO Jeff Webb became president and CEO of Herff Jones. Herff Jones acquired BSN Sports in 2013. 

In June 2014, it was announced that the company as a whole would operate under the Varsity Brands name in order to reflect a more integrated operation. The company was then sold to the private equity group Charlesbank Capital Partners. In 2018, it was sold to Bain Capital for around $2.5 billion.

Adam Blumenfeld, who served as CEO of BSN Sports since 2007, was named CEO of Varsity Brands in 2017.

Antitrust and sexual assault lawsuits  
In May 2020, Varsity Brands faced a consolidated lawsuit over monopoly control in the cheerleading apparel industry.

In September 2022, Varsity Brands also faced two lawsuits regarding sexual assault charges related to Varsity-Brands-connected coaches.

References

External links
 
Star Athletica, LLC v. Varsity Brands, Inc. at SCOTUSblog

Companies based in the Dallas–Fort Worth metroplex
Cheerleading
Sporting goods manufacturers of the United States
Bain Capital companies
2018 mergers and acquisitions